The contents of this article is a list of things named after Subrahmanyan Chandrasekhar.
Chandrasekhar

 Chandrasekhar limit
 Chandrasekhar friction
 Chandrasekhar polarization
 Chandrasekhar–Kendall function
 Chandrasekhar's H-function
 Schönberg–Chandrasekhar limit
 Velikhov–Chandrasekhar instability
 Batchelor–Chandrasekhar equation
 Chandrasekhar–Page equations
 Chandrasekhar's white dwarf equation
 Chandrasekhar–Fermi method
 Chandrasekhar–Friedman–Schutz instability
 Chandrasekhar–Wentzel lemma
 Chandrasekhar number
 Emden–Chandrasekhar equation
 Chandrasekhar tensor
 Chandrasekhar virial equations
 Chandrasekhar's X- and Y-function
 Chandrasekhar's Variational Principle

Others
 Chandra X-ray Observatory
 1958 Chandra
 Himalayan Chandra Telescope